John Backwell (20 April 1654 – 15 April 1708) was an English politician, the son of the financier Edward Backwell.

In 1678, he married Elizabeth Tyringham, only daughter of Sir William Tyringham, by whom he had a son, Tyringham Backwell. He inherited his father-in-law's estates in Buckinghamshire, and was twice returned for Member for Wendover. With his father, he was appointed comptroller of customs in the port of London in 1671.

Notes

1654 births
1708 deaths
English MPs 1685–1687
English MPs 1690–1695
English MPs 1695–1698
English MPs 1698–1700
English MPs 1701
Tyringham
John